Dunsforths is a civil parish in the Borough of Harrogate of North Yorkshire, England. In 2011, the civil parish had 224 inhabitants. It consists of Lower Dunsforth and Upper Dunsforth.

References

Civil parishes in North Yorkshire
Borough of Harrogate